Weesperzijde (Amsterdam) is a neighbourhood of Amsterdam, Netherlands, aligned along the east side of Amstelriver. It is a well-to-do residential area with a familial atmosphere, characterised by houses built during the last turn of centuries, some by famous Dutch architects like Dolf van Gendt and Abraham Salm.

Neighbourhoods of Amsterdam
Amsterdam-Oost